Jonathan Cheung Wing-hong (born 26 December 1981), native of Zhongshan, Guangdong, is a Hong Kong actor since 2001. He is currently contracted to TVB.

Career

In 2006, Johnathan Cheung joined TVB by Andy's recommendation and mostly played supporting roles. In 2012, he gained more attention from the audience with his supporting role in the drama Three Kingdoms RPG, starring alongside Kenneth Ma.

In 2016, Cheung gained recognition with his performance in the drama House of Spirits, winning the Favourite TVB Most Improved Male Artiste award at the 2016 TVB Star Awards Malaysia. He also earned his first Best Supporting Actor nomination and won the 
Most Improved Male Artiste award at the 2016 TVB Anniversary Awards.

In 2019, Cheung starred in the drama Our Unwinding Ethos as the second male lead for the first time. With his role in the drama The Man Who Kills Trouble, he garnered his first Best Actor nomination at the 2019 TVB Anniversary Awards.

In 2020, Cheung received attention for his villainous role in the drama Forensic Heroes IV, and was nominated for Best Supporting Actor at the 2020 TVB Anniversary Awards again. In 2021, he starred in the drama Sinister Beings as the main villain, again receiving attention from netizens. With this role, he was placed among the top 5 nominees for the Best Supporting Actor at the 2021 TVB Anniversary Awards.

Personal life
Cheung and TVB host Angie Mak first met each other at TVB Anniversary gala's rehearsal. Cheung then tried to know more about her from his acting classmates and searched online. While they were together Mak got to know more about Cheung. They got married in 2012. Mak gave birth to their daughter, Makayla (張雅喬), on 22 May 2014. Their son (張迅喬) was born on 17 Oct 2017. On 21 May 2021, Cheung announced on Instagram that Mak is pregnant with their third child. On 24 September, the couple announced that their second son was born.

Filmography

TV dramas

Film

Awards and nominations

TVB Anniversary Awards

TVB Star Awards Malaysia

StarHub TVB Awards

People's Choice Television Awards

References

External links

Living people
1981 births
Hong Kong male television actors
21st-century Hong Kong male actors